VinaCapital is one of the largest investment management firms in Vietnam. As of 2021, the firm has more than $3.7 billion in assets under management.

History 
VinaCapital was one of the first investment firms in Vietnam and was founded in 2003 by Don Lam and Horst Geicke, who served as executive chairman until 2012. The company developed a diversified portfolio including several funds and also founded the VinaCapital Foundation, a public charitable organization to empower children and youth in Vietnam such as financing of cardiac surgery.

In 2003, the firm launched the VinaCapital Vietnam Opportunity Fund, a closed-end fund now trading on the London Stock Exchange’s Main Market.

In 2004, VinaCapital invested in VinaGames (later VNG Corp), one of the largest and fastest growing technology companies in Southeast Asia at that time. 

In 2006, VinaCapital and Draper Fisher Jurvetson launched DFJVinaCapital, a venture capital fund to invest in technology companies and privatised telecommunications companies.

In August 2018, VinaCapital launched VinaCapital Ventures, a technology investment platform. In June 2019, the company announced that it had formed a strategic partnership with the Mirae Asset - Naver Asia Growth Fund.

In July 2019, VinaCapital acquired Smartly Pte Ltd., a Singapore-based robo-advisory investment platform, which it wound down in March 2020 due to "intense competition".

VinaCapital was awarded "Best Fund House - Vietnam" by Asia Asset Management magazine in 2018, 2019 and 2020.

In March 2021, the company announced that it would jointly invest with GS Energy to develop a 3,000MW LNG power plant in Long An province. In October 2021, VinaCapital announced that EDF Renewables had made a "significant investment" in its rooftop solar subsidiary, SkyX.

Management 
The current Chairman is Jonathan Choi, the Chairman of Sunwah International in Hong Kong. The CEO is Don Lam, who co-founded the company in 2003 after working at PwC (Vietnam).

Notable activities
VinaCapital's funds include:
VinaCapital Vietnam Opportunity Fund (VOF) is listed on the London Stock Exchange and a constituent of the FTSE 250 Index.
DFJ VinaCapital (DFJV) with Draper Fisher Jurvetson
Forum One - VCG Partners Vietnam Fund, a UCITS-compliant, open-ended fund.
VinaCapital Equity Special Access Fund (VESAF)
VinaCapital Insights Balanced fund (VIBF)
VinaCapital VN100 ETF
VinaCapital Liquidity Bond Fund (VLBF)

References

External links
 Official website of VinaCapital
 Official website of VinaCapital Vietnam Opportunity Fund
 Official website of DFJ VinaCapital
Official website of the VinaCapital Foundation

Financial services companies established in 2003
Investment companies of Vietnam
Vietnamese companies established in 2003